is honorary chairman of Toyota Motor Corporation. In the Japanese system, that puts him in charge of the country's and world's largest automaker. Chō is only the second "outsider" to head Toyota Motor Co. since the members of the founding Toyoda family stepped aside in 1995.

He earned a bachelor's degree in law from the University of Tokyo in March 1960. Chō joined the Toyota Motor Corporation in April 1960. Chō's previous titles include: managing director, senior managing director, vice president, president and vice chairman of the board. He previously worked as president in a subsidiary. Chō has been serving as chairman of the board and representative director of Toyota Motor Corporation from June 2006 to  June 2013.

Chō has been a strong advocate of environmentally friendly automotive technology, such as the hybrid-electric Prius.

Honors
 Medal of Honor with Blue Ribbon (November 2001)
 Officer of the Legion of Honor of France (May 2004)
 Honorary Knight Commander of the Order of the British Empire (KBE) (October 2006)
 Grand Decoration of Honor in Silver with Star of Austria (January 2009)
 Grand Cordon of the Order of the Rising Sun, 2009.
 Time magazine, 100 most influential people of 2004.

Notes

1937 births
Living people
Toyota people
Japanese businesspeople
People from Aichi Prefecture
Recipients of the Order of the Rising Sun
Honorary Knights Commander of the Order of the British Empire
University of Tokyo alumni
Presidents of the Japan Automobile Manufacturers Association